Picketpost Mountain is located just outside the town of Superior, Arizona approximately  east of the Phoenix Metro Area.  The mountain is located in the southern desert region of Tonto National Forest near (but not within) the Superstition Mountains, and is popular with hikers.  The mountain is also well known for an oddly placed mailbox at the top of the mountain, which contains the log books for the Picketpost Mountain Trail.

The mountain's unusual name stems from an early military camp established at the base of the mountain by General George Stoneman in 1870.  The soldiers nicknamed the mountain “Picket Post” due to its usage as a sentinel point to guard their camp from attacks.  This military camp eventually grew into the present day town of Superior.

References

External links
 

Mountains of Arizona
Landforms of Pinal County, Arizona
Mountains of Pinal County, Arizona